Joint Publishing, also known as Sanlian Press or SDX Joint Publishing, is a book store chain and publisher founded at Queen's Road Central in Hong Kong on 18 October 1948. Joint Publishing (Hong Kong) is one of major book store chains in Hong Kong and currently a subsidiary company of Sino United Publishing (Holdings) Limited. The Mainland China branches of the book store chain, such as SDX Joint Publishing and Shanghai Joint Publishing were owned by separate holding company of the Chinese government.

Joint Publishing (Hong Kong)'s parent company Sino United Publishing, was owned by Chinese central government agency Hong Kong Liaison Office.

History

The book store was the result of a merger in 1948 between three leading Shanghai publishers and book stores, Life, Reading and New Knowledge. The newly merged bookstore brought together all the names of its previous entities, but was often referred to in English as SDX Joint Publishing, taking the first initial of each of the previous names to form an acronym, or simply Sanlian Press or Joint Publishing. Shortly after it was formed, it moved its headquarters to Beijing in March 1949 and established its Hong Kong-based subsidiary.

After the establishment of People's Republic of China on 1 October 1949, the bookstore located in Hong Kong was mainly responsible for publishing materials from mainland China, while the main branch in mainland China was nationalized. After the coming of Cultural Revolution in mainland China in 1966, the publishing business in mainland China was seriously damaged and the bookstore in Hong Kong survived by republishing old books.

With several re-locations, it finally settled in current premises in Queen Victoria Street in May 1971 and opened a retail store at the ground floor in July 1974.

The Cultural Revolution ended in 1976 and was soon replaced with economic reform.  In 1978 the book store in Hong Kong decided to publish their own books independently and join with other international publishers.  It initially targeted in Chinese culture, literature and art and later concentrated Hong Kong topics and social science.  Its direction was proved successful and the book store aggressively opened branches in Hong Kong.

Outside Hong Kong, the book store expanded to various cities in mainland China by joint venture, and five stores in North America, specifically in Toronto, Vancouver, New York, Los Angeles, and San Francisco.

In January 1988, the Hong Kong-based Joint Publishing was registered as a limited liability company called 'Joint Publishing (Hong Kong) Company Limited'.

In March 2021, Joint Publishing was found guilty of defamation, publishing information that the High Court found false, including claims that the United States had funded opposition groups in Hong Kong.

Subsidiaries
Shanghai Hong Kong Joint Publishing Co., Ltd.: Established in October 1999, it is a joint venture between Joint Publishing (Hong Kong), Shanghai Book and Shanghai Joint Publishing.

Namesake
SDX Joint Publishing: The mainland branch of Joint Publishing was merged with state-owned the People's Publishing House in 1951. In January 1986, it became an independent company unrelated to the Joint Publishing (Hong Kong).
Shanghai Joint Publishing: It was founded in 1986 by People's Publishing House as a subsidiary of Jiefang Daily, unrelated to the Joint Publishing (Hong Kong).

References

External links
Official website 
History on official website 
SDX Joint Publishing Company
長灘急流，舵穩帆高──寫在生活書店成立70週年 

Publishing companies of Hong Kong
Publishing companies established in 1948
Bookshops of Hong Kong
Book publishing companies of China